This is a list of schools in the London Borough of Bexley, England.

State-funded schools

Primary schools 

Barnehurst Infant School
Barnehurst Junior School
Barrington Primary School
Bedonwell Infant School
Bedonwell Junior School
Belmont Academy
Belvedere Infant School
Belvedere Junior School
Birkbeck Primary School
Bishop Ridley CE Primary School
Brampton Primary Academy
Burnt Oak Junior School
Bursted Wood Primary School
Castilion Primary School
Chatsworth Infant School
Christ Church CE Primary School
Crook Log Primary School
Danson Primary School
Days Lane Primary School
Dulverton Primary School
East Wickham Primary Academy
Eastcote Primary Academy
Foster's Primary School
Gravel Hill Primary School
Haberdashers' Crayford Temple Grove
Haberdashers' Slade Green Temple Grove
Harris Garrard Academy
Hillsgrove Primary School
Holy Trinity Lamorbey CE Primary School
Hook Lane Primary School
Hope Community School
Hurst Primary School
Jubilee Primary School
Lessness Heath Primary School
Longlands Primary School
Mayplace Primary School
Normandy Primary School
Northumberland Heath Primary School
Northwood Primary School
Old Bexley CE Primary School
Orchard Primary School
Our Lady of the Rosary RC Primary School
Parkway Primary School
Peareswood Primary School
Pelham Primary School
Pelham Primary School
Royal Park Primary Academy
St Augustine of Canterbury CE Primary School
St Fidelis RC Primary School
St John Fisher RC Primary School
St Joseph's RC Primary School
St Michael's East Wickham CE Primary School
St Paulinus CE Primary School
St Paul's CE Primary School
St Peter Chanel RC Primary School
St Stephen's RC Primary School
St Thomas More RC Primary School
Sherwood Park Primary School
Upland Primary School
Upton Primary School
Willow Bank Primary School

Non-selective secondary schools 

Bexleyheath Academy
Blackfen School for Girls
Cleeve Park School
Haberdashers' Crayford Academy
Harris Academy Falconwood
Harris Garrard Academy
Hurstmere School
St Catherine's Catholic School for Girls
St Columba's Catholic Boys' School
Trinity School
Welling School

Bilateral schools 
King Henry School

Grammar schools 
Beths Grammar School (Boys)
Bexley Grammar School
Chislehurst and Sidcup Grammar School
Townley Grammar School (Girls)

Special and alternative schools 

Aspire Academy Bexley
Cleeve Meadow School
Cornerstone School
Endeavour Academy Bexley
Horizons Academy Bexley
Marlborough School
Shenstone School
Woodside Academy

Further education 
Bexley College
Christ the King: St Mary's

Independent schools

Primary and preparatory schools 
Benedict House Preparatory School
Merton Court School
West Lodge School

Special and alternative schools 
ADO River Valley
Break Through
Park View Academy

Further education 
Bird College

References 

 
Bexley